Ricardo Riquelme Vega, also known as El Rico. is a Chilean criminal, who had been convicted of ordering an assassination and laundering illicit drug money.

Criminal career
His first arrest for cocaine trafficking was in Germany in 1990.

He is believed to be a right hand man of Naoufal Fassih and a senior member of the gang responsible for the murder and beheading of Nabil Amzieb.

He was arrested in a hotel in Santiago, Chile in October 2017.

On 31 May 2021 he was convicted of operating an assassination ring and laundering illicit drug money. The trial was held in a fortified court known as De Bunker near Amsterdam Airport Schiphol. The court heard that he was in contact with Ridouan Taghi about organising murders. Judges were also told his phone had a video featuring both Daniel Kinahan and Raffaele Imperiale. It was alleged that Vega, Kinahan, Imperiale and Naoufal Fassih were involved in an illicit drugs cartel that dominated the market in Europe.

See also
Marengo process

References

Chilean criminals
Living people
Year of birth missing (living people)